Clinical Genetics is a monthly peer-reviewed medical journal covering medical genetics. It was established in 1970 and is published by Wiley-Blackwell. The editor-in-chief is Reiner A. Veitia (University of Paris).

Abstracting and indexing
The journal is abstracted and indexed in:

According to the Journal Citation Reports, its 2018 impact factor is 4.104.

References

External links

Wiley-Blackwell academic journals
Publications established in 1970
English-language journals
Monthly journals
Medical genetics journals